The Water Valley School District is a public school district based in Water Valley, Mississippi (USA).

In addition to Water Valley, the district also serves rural areas in northeastern Yalobusha County.

Schools
Water Valley High School (Grades 7-12)
Water Valley Elementary School (a.k.a. Davidson Elementary) (Grades K-6)

Demographics

2006-07 school year
There were a total of 1,331 students enrolled in the Water Valley School District during the 2006–2007 school year. The gender makeup of the district was 49% female and 51% male. The racial makeup of the district was 45.83% African American, 53.49% White, and 0.68% Hispanic. 56.2% of the district's students were eligible to receive free lunch.

Previous school years

Accountability statistics

See also
List of school districts in Mississippi

References

External links
 

Education in Yalobusha County, Mississippi
School districts in Mississippi